Partners is an American sitcom that aired on Fox from 1995 to 1996.

Synopsis

The series centered on a pair of young architects in San Francisco, Bob (Jon Cryer) and Owen (Tate Donovan), and Owen's fiancée Alicia (Maria Pitillo).  Much of the show's humor derived from Bob's lack of success with women and his competition with Alicia for Owen's attention. The series was canceled after 22 episodes.

Cast

Main cast 

 Jon Cryer as Bob (22 episodes)
 Tate Donovan as Owen (22 episodes)
 Maria Pitillo as Alicia Sondergard (22 episodes)
 Catherine Lloyd Burns as Heather Pond (22 episodes)

Recurring cast 

 Corinne Bohrer as Lolie (7 episodes)
 James Cromwell as Mr. Saxonhouse (2 episodes)
 Lawrence Pressman as Gordon (2 episodes)

Guest stars 

 Xander Berkeley as Christophe Nnngaarzh
 Ilana Levine as Loretta
 Joel Murray as Ron Wolfe
 Alex Rocco as Warren
 Eric Stoltz as Cameron
 Jennifer Aniston as CPA Suzanne, Bob's love interest
 Jason Bernard as Leavitt
 Mimi Rogers as Melissa, Bob's old babysitter
 Courtney Thorne-Smith as Danielle, Bob's love interest
 Lisa Edelstein as Cindy Wolfe
 Willie Garson as Larry
 Simon Templeman as Carl
 Thomas Haden Church as Ned Dorsey
 Debra Messing as Stacey Colbert
 Julie Cobb as Mrs. Blumenthal
 Susan Egan as Gina
 Kathy Griffin as Michelle
 Fred Stoller as Mickey

Crossover
The ninth episode, "City Hall", crossed over with another Fox series, Ned & Stacey, when Debra Messing and Thomas Haden Church appeared as their characters in the episode.

Series overview

Episodes

Season 1 (1995–96)

Awards and nominations

External links

1990s American sitcoms
1995 American television series debuts
1996 American television series endings
English-language television shows
Fox Broadcasting Company original programming
Television shows set in San Francisco
Television series by Universal Television